OLN (Outdoor Life Network) is a Canadian cable television channel.

OLN may also refer to:
 NBCSN, an American television channel known as OLN from 1995 to 2006
 Lago Musters Airport (IATA airport code), serving Sarmiento, Chubut Province, Argentina
 Olin Corporation (New York Stock Exchange ticker symbol), a manufacturing conglomerate